The Bauges Mountains (French: Massif des Bauges) is a mountain range in Auvergne-Rhône-Alpes, Eastern France, stretching from the city of Annecy, Haute-Savoie to the city of Chambéry, Savoie, which is part of the French Prealps.

Major peaks 
The Bauges have fourteen summits above :

 Arcalod, highest point in the range
 Sambuy, 
 Pécloz, 
 Trélod, 
 Pointe de Chaurionde, 
 Mont d'Armenaz, 
 Pointe des Arces, 
 Mont de la Coche, 
 Dent de Cons, 
 Pointe des Arlicots, 
 Mont Colombier, 
 Dent d'Arclusaz, 
 Grand Parra, 

Other noteworthy summits include:

 Montagne du Charbon, 
 Semnoz, above Annecy
 Pointe de la Galoppaz, 
 Nivolet, above Chambéry
 Mont Revard, above Aix-les-Bains
 Mont Peney,

Caving 

The Bauges massif contains many underground cavities. There are three main sectors: the Margériaz, the Revard sector and the mountain of Bange-Prépoulain. Under these karsts large underground networks develop in particular the Creux de la Benoite-Litorne-Grotte de Prérouge with a depth of 860 meters for 54 kilometers of development. The Margériaz sector is renowned for the length and difficulty of its meanders, which are particularly difficult to explore.

References 

Mountain ranges of the Alps
Mountain ranges of Auvergne-Rhône-Alpes